The Cavalry Corps was a cavalry corps of the British Army in the First World War. The corps was formed in France in October 1914, under General Sir Edmund Allenby. It was later broken up in March 1916, but re-established in the following September.  It served as part of the British Expeditionary Force on the Western Front throughout its existence.

Formation

The Corps consisted of the three cavalry divisions serving in France, the 1st, 2nd, 3rd divisions.

The cavalry division consisted of cavalry regiments in brigades. They were armed with rifles, unlike their French and German counterparts, who were only armed with the shorter range carbine. The cavalry division also had a high allocation of artillery compared to foreign cavalry divisions, with 24 13-pounder guns organised into two brigades and two machine guns for each regiment. However, when dismounted, the cavalry division was the equivalent of two weakened infantry brigades with less artillery than the infantry division.

Battles
Battle of La Bassee
Battle of Messines (1914)
Battle of Arras (1914) 
Battle of Cambrai (1917)  
 The Battles of the Hindenburg Line

Commanders

See also
British Army during World War I
British Cavalry Corps order of battle 1914
British cavalry during the First World War

References

Bibliography

External links
The British Corps of 1914-1918 on The Long, Long Trail

Military units and formations established in 1914
Military units and formations disestablished in 1916
Military units and formations established in 1916
Military units and formations disestablished in 1919
Cavalry units and formations of the United Kingdom
Corps of the British Army in World War I
British Army in World War I
British field corps
United Kingdom